Sharon Dolin is a Jewish American poet, translator, and essayist, who is noted for her work in ekphrasis—writing in dialogue with art.

Life
Born and raised in Brooklyn, New York, she lives in Manhattan, where she is Associate Editor of Barrow Street Press and directs Writing about Art in Barcelona. Dolin earned her B.A. degree from Cornell University in 1977, an M.A. from University of California at Berkeley in 1982, and a Ph.D. from Cornell University in 1990.
Dolin received the Witter Bynner Fellowship from the Library of Congress and the AWP Donald Hall Prize for Poetry.

Dolin co-founded the Center for Book Arts Letterpress Poetry Chapbook Competition as well as the CBA Broadside Reading Series. She has taught at The Cooper Union, Hofstra University, The New School (where she was Writer-in-Residence at Eugene Lang College from 2006 to 2012), the Unterberg Poetry Center of the 92nd Street Y, and Poets House.

Published works

Translations
 . Translated from the Catalan by Sharon Dolin.

References

External links
 Learning Early from Hitchcock that Nightmares Can be Real. Excerpt for Hitchcock Blonde on LitHub.
 Sharon Dolin on Advice, Poetry and "Happenstance". Missouri Review Interview.
 Economy of Means: On Translating Gemma Gorga.
 Q&A: Sharon Dolin. Poetry Magazine interview from 2012.
 Poet Invents Eighth Deadly Sin. NPR Interview from 2008.

Year of birth missing (living people)
Living people
American poets
Cornell University alumni
University of California, Berkeley alumni